Coulombiers is a former commune in the Sarthe department in the Pays de la Loire region in north-western France. On 1 January 2019, it was merged into the commune Fresnay-sur-Sarthe.

See also
Communes of the Sarthe department

References

Former communes of Sarthe